Cuivre Township is an inactive township in Pike County, in the U.S. state of Missouri.

Cuivre Township was erected in 1820, taking its name from the North Fork Cuivre River.

References

Townships in Missouri
Townships in Pike County, Missouri